Of the People is a 2008 Indian Malayalam-language vigilante film directed and produced by Jayaraj. It is a sequel to 4 the People (2004) and  By the People (2005)  . Arun, Padmakumar and Arjun are in the cast. The story was written by Jayaraj, while the screenplay was written by Sreekumar Sreyams.

Plot
"FourThe People" are released from jail and re-start what they did earlier. Now an  A.C.P. Harishanker (Harshan) joins their team as a police informer. But the new threat against "Of The People" is formed.

Cast
 Arun as Aravind Sebastian
 Padmakumar as Shefeek
 Arjun Bose as Iswar iyyer
 Harshan as A.C.P Harishanker
 Devipriya as Nancy Isacc
 Govind as Mani Sharmma
 Mahesh S as Mohana Swamy
 Kaimal as Rajindra Singh
 Biju as Mahesh Kumar
 Anoop as Nazer
 Sunil John as Dixon Abanazeer
 Jolly as Jithesh Kumar
 Sabitha Jayaraj as Sreelakshmi
 Govind Singh as Lee
Sambsivan T.V as Mosqo Velayudhan

Reception
Nowrunning wrote that "In total Of the People leaves much to be desired and could very well be called a wasted effort. But as said earlier, there is solace in the thought that the film is somehow better than By the People".

References

External links

2008 films
2000s Malayalam-language films
People3
Indian sequel films